The Lysebotn Power Station  is a hydroelectric power station located in the municipality Sandnes in Rogaland, Norway. The average annual production is 1,242 GWh. It has produced 63 TWh since it started in 1953.

A new NOK 1.8 billion powerplant called Lysebotn II with 370 MW Francis turbines was built nearby, with an expected life of 6070 years. The tunnels are 7.8 km long, 45 m2 wide, and transporting 60 m3/second. It officially opened on the 17th of September 2018.

The reservoir has a capacity of  water located at 636686 m altitude.

See also

 Flørli Hydroelectric Power Station

References 

Hydroelectric power stations in Norway
Buildings and structures in Rogaland